Hardwick is the name of two villages in Oxfordshire, England:
Hardwick, West Oxfordshire near Witney,
Hardwick, Cherwell near Bicester.